Ramgarh district is one of the 24 districts in the Indian state of Jharkhand.  It was also a military district during the British Regime, referred to then as Ramgarh district.

Introduction and geography 

Ramgarh was made a district on 12 September 2007. It was carved out of erstwhile Hazaribagh District. Ramgarh lies at the heart of the Jharkhand state. It is a mining, industrial and cultural hub with the Maa Chhinnamasta Temple. In 1670s, the king Dalel Singh shifted the  capital of Ramgarh Raj to Ramgarh and named it after his father Ram Singh. The district of Ramgarh has been named after the town Ramgarh, its present headquarters.

Subdivision: Ramgarh

District Registration office is in Gola.

Politics 

 |}

Civic Administration
Lok Sabha Constituencies: Hazaribagh

Vidhan Sabha Constituencies:
 Ramgarh: Ramgarh Police Station (excluding G.Ps. Terpa, Patratu, Koto, Palani, Hapuhua, Harikarpur, Gegda, Deoria, Bargama, Pali, Salgo, Sanki, Jabo, Chaingari, Chikor, Lapanga, Ghutua, Barkakana and Sidhwar-Kalan) and Gola Police Station.
 Mandu (Part): Mandu Police Stations.
 Barkagaon (Part): G.Ps. Terpa, Patratu, Koto, Palani, Hapuhua, Harijarpu Gegda, Deoria, Bargama, Pali, Salgo, Sanki, Jabo, Chaingara, Chikor, Lapanga, Ghutua, Barkakana and Sidhwar-Kalan in Ramgarh Police Station.

Ramgarh District borders:

North and West: Hazaribagh District

North and East: Bokaro District

East: Purulia District (West Bengal)

South: Ranchi District

Administration 
Ramgarh district consists of six blocks (or 'mandals'). These include Ramgarh, Gola, Mandu, Patratu, Chitarpur, and Dulmi blocks.

History

Etymology

The word Ram is derived from Murram and Gadh is derived from Beluagadha. In Hazaribagh district, there is Sitagadha and Vishnugadha. Thus, the name Ramgarh must have been derived by using syllables of these places.

Ancient history 
Stone age: Along the river Damodar in Ramgarh, early Stone Age (Lower Paleolithic) tools were found.

Mahajanapadas: The gigantic king Jarasandh was very powerful. Chotanagpur was in his jurisdiction; probably the Chhotanagpur was under sub-ordination of Mahapadam of Magadh Nand Ugrasen of Nagwanshi's.

Maurya Empire: It is also said that entire Chhotanagpur was under sub-ordination of Ashoka the Great ( BC) so that in Buddha period.

Buddhism and Jainism: It is certified by the symbolic relics of Buddha period in the temple of Gola. Probably in the 8th century BC. (3) Jain Trithankar was constructed in Parasnath.

Gupta Empire: King Samudragupta ( AD) had invaded Eastern Deccan by passing through this area.

Medieval period 

In Turk-Afghan period (1206-1526 AD.), Jharkhand the forest country was under subordination of ruler of that time. The Ramgarh Raj was established in 1368. The founder King of Ramgarh regime was King Bagdeo Singh. At that time the capital of Ramgarh was in Sira. The headquarters of the capital was moved to Urda, Badam, Ramgarh and Padma one by one. In 1670 the headquarters of Ramgarh regime was moved to Ramgarh. The Ramgarh Regime is also known as Padma Raja or Regime.

British regime 
The power of obtaining reference from Ramgarh regime was given to East India Company by King Shah Alam II.

In 1771, Captain Comac was made Military Collector of Ramgarh District, whose headquarters was in Chatra. The military district of Ramgarh contained Nagpur, Palamu, Hazaribagh, Chatra, Giridih and Kodarma. At that the headquarters of Ramgarh Battalion was Hazaribagh, whose commander was a European. The district name is often spelled "Ramghur" in English documents of the time.
 
"It appears that the social reformer and the founder of the Brahm Samaj Raja Ram Mohan Roy was in Ramgarh in 1805-06. He went there with Mr. William Digby who was then acting Magistrate and Registrar of Ramgarh. Raja Ram Mohan Roy was the Sheristeder of the Collectorate and lived both at Cahtra and Ramgarh in this capacity when Mr. William Digby was transferred else here he took Ram Mohan Roy with him to his new place of work".

In 1811, Ramgarh Battalion was used for suppressing the Munda, Uraon and Tamad Revolt and Kol revolt. In 1837, Ramgarh was a police station for the British government. In 1938, a new G.T. road was built and Banaras road was closed. It is worth mentioning the name of Lubia Manghi. Bainu Manjhi and Arjun Manjhi. In Sitagarh, coffee was grown. The name of Rupu Manjhi is famous in the first national revolt of 1857.

On 8 January 1856, Sheik Bhikari and Thakur Upraon Singh were hanged on a bunyan tree in Chhuttupalu valley. This valley is also known as lalki Ghaati and that bunyan tree is called Phansiyahi bore.

Ramgarh Cantonment council was structured in 1941. There are two Army training centers, Sikh Regimental Centre (SRC) and Punjab Regimental Centre (PRC).

Indian National Congress 

In March 1940, INC 53rd Session was accomplished under the presidency of Maulana Abul Qalam Azad at Jhanda Chowk, Ramgarh now Ramgarh Cantonment Mahatma Gandhi, Jawaharlal Nehru, Sardar Patel, Dr. Rajendra Prasad, Sarojini Naidu, Khan Abdul Ghaffar Khan, Acharya J.B. Kripalani, Industrialist Jamnalal Bajaj and other leaders of the Indian freedom movement attended the Ramgarh Session. Mahatma Gandhi also opened khadi and village Industries Exhibition at Ramgarh.

At that time, under the leadership of Netajee Subhas Chandra Bose, a conference against Samjhauta was also completed.  In Ramgarh, Subhsha Chandra Bose was seen as president of All India Forward Block and M.N. Roy was seen as leader of the radical democratic party.

Post-independence 
After independence in 1947, the territory of the present-day Ramgarh district became a part of erstwhile Hazaribagh district. In 1952 Ramgarh Block was created and in 1991 Ramgarh Subdivision was formed. Sikh Regimental Centre was shifted from Merrut to Ramgarh Cantonment in 1976. On 12 September 2007, Ramgarh was made a district consisting of Ramgarh, Gola, Mandu and Patratu Block, taking the total count of districts in the state to 24.

On 13 September 2012, Ramgarh become the first district in the country where payment of government schemes like KCC and Indra Awash was done through UID or Aadhaar cards.

Physiography and rivers

Physiography

The district is a part of Chotanagpur plateau. Important physiographic regions of the district are Damodar Trough or Upper Damodar basin or Damodar Valley. The majority of the district falls in the Damodar Valley. Damodar Valley is bounded by Hazaribag Plateau in north and Ranchi Plateau in south. Ranchi and Hazaribag plateau is separated by east–west running Damodar Valley.

Rivers and river basins

Damodar is the main river of the district and it also forms a major river basin, comprising a number of tributaries. Important amongst them are: Naikari, Bhervi or Bhera and Bokaro river.

In Hindu mythology and folklore Damodar is a Nad means Male River.

Small rivers include the Hurhuri, Gomti, Barki, Kurum, Kochi, Sherbhuki, and Dhobdhab rivers.

Suwarn Rekha River flow south eastern part of district. Tributaries of Suwarn Rekha River include Kadamgara and Khatgara.

Waterfalls

Rajrappa Fall is on the confluence of the Bhairavi (Bhera) and Damodar Rivers.

Nalkari Dam is in Patratu.

Geology and mineral resources 

The district holds a strong position on the mineral map of the country. The district is endowed with a large and rich deposit of coal and coalbed methane (CBM) and also possesses various other minerals like limestone as well as fire clay.

The coalfields of the Ramgarh district lie in the Damodar Valley. The important geological formation of the district is the Gondwana System and the rocks of the Damuda Group of Lower Gondwana age comprises the most important coal seams. The district's coal deposits are mainly found in South Karanpura, West Bokaro and Ramgarh coalfields.

Coal mines

Central Coalfields Limited is a subsidiary of Coal India Ltd. The coalfield is divided into the following areas:

South Karanpura coalfields

Barka Sayal Area:
 Saunda D (formerly known as Bird Saunda) underground mines
 Saunda D open cast mines (not in operation)
 Central Saunda underground mines
 Saunda underground mines
 Sayal D underground mines
 Urimari underground mines
 Bhurkunda open cast mines

Argada Area:
 Sirka open cast mines
 Sirka underground mines
 Argada underground mines

Ramgarh coalfields

Rajrappa Area:
 Rajrappa Project (formerly known as Ramgarh Project) open cast mines.
 CCL Coal Washery: RajrappaWashery

West Bokaro coalfields

Kuju Area :
 Sarubera open cast mines
 Sarubera underground mines
 Ara open cast mines
 Kuiu underground mines
 Topa open cast mines
 Topa underground mines
 Pindra open cast mines
 Pindra underground mines
 Pundi open cast mines
 Karma open cast mines

Hazaribag Area:
 Kedla underground mines
 Kedla open cast mines
 Jharkhand open cast mines
 Laiyo underground mines
 Parej East open cast mines
 Tapin North, open cast mines
 Tapin South, mixed (open cast and underground).

CCL Coal Washery:
 Kedla Washery

Tata Steel:
 West Bokaro (Ghato) open cast mines
 Tata Steel established the country's first coal washery at West Bokaro (Ghato) in 1951.

Mines Rescue Station (CCL):
 Naisarai, Ramgarh.

Rescue Room (CCL):
 Kedla

Captive coal mining blocks 

Captive coal blocks allocated  to different companies by the Ministry of Coal, Government of India in the district are the following:
 Sugia: Jharkhand State Mineral Development Corporation
 Rauta: Jharkhand State Mineral Development Corporation
 Burakhap: Jharkhand State Mineral Development Corporation
 Kotre–Basantpur: TISCO (Tata steel)
 Patratu: Jharkhand State Mineral Development Corporation

Coal-bed methane

Coal-bed methane (CBM), is an eco-friendly natural gas, stored in coal seams, generated during the process of the coalification. ONGC is doing exploration work in South Karanpura Coalfields for CBM.

Underground coal gasification 

Coal India Limited has identified two sites for developing UCG with Joint Venture Partners. Kaitha Block in Ramgarh coalfield under CCL command area is one of them.

Mineral royalty and other minerals

Mineral royalty:
 2011–12:  
 2012–13:  

Other minerals:
 Limestone: Isolated patches of limestone occur along a belt extending east and west parallel with the coalfields.
 Iron ore: In the Ramgarh, Bokaro and Karanpura coalfields, nodules and lenticles of iron ore are found. At one time these were used by indigenous smelters.

The first auction ("Composite License" [Prospecting License- cum-Mining Lease]) of any mineral block in the country after the commencement of MMDR act 2015 was held by the Jharkhand government in the District of Ramgarh. The two limestone blocks are:
 Hariharpur Lem Bicha block I
 Hariharpur Lem Bicha block II

Burnpur Cement, Patratu, was the successful bidder.

Industries and agriculture

Industries 

Ramgarh is an important industrial district of East India. Several mineral-based industries like steel, sponge iron, cement, refractory and thermal power plants are established due to the availability of coal and other minerals.

Agriculture 

The main occupation of the people of Ramgarh is farming. There are three main agricultural seasons in the district: kharif, rabi, and zaid. Rice, maize, ragi, fruits and vegetables are the main crops of the district.

Soils, climate, forests and wildlife

Soils and climate

There are mainly two types of soil, red soil and sand loam.

In terms of climate, the area lies in the sub-humid region of Chotanagpur Plateau and has a semi-extreme type of climate. The day temperature rises to around  during the summers and drops to around  during the winter.

The winter season broadly runs from November to February, the hot season from March to May, and the rainy season from June to October.

Forests and wildlife

The district is rich in flora and fauna. The government has planned a deer park in the district.

Demographics
According to the 2011 census, Ramgarh district has a population of 949,443, roughly equal to the nation of Fiji or the US state of Delaware. This gives it a ranking of 459th in India (out of a total of 640). 
Its population growth rate over the decade 2001-2011 was 13.06%. Ramgarh has a sex ratio of 921 females for every 1000 males, and a literacy rate of 73.92%. Scheduled Castes made up 11.2% of the population; 21.2% were Scheduled Tribes.

Hindus make up 81.55% of the population, Muslims make up 13.59%, and Sarnaism makes up 3.41% of the population. Christians make up 0.76% of the population.

At the time of the 2011 Census of India, 56.63% of the population in the district spoke Khortha, 18.2% Hindi, 8.17% Urdu, 4.53% Santali, 2.91% Bhojpuri, 2.78% Magahi and 1.59% Bengali as their first language.

Transport

Rail 

In 1927, Bengal Nagpur Railway (BNR) opened the  Chandil-Barkakana section to traffic. The same year, the Central India Coalfields (CIC) Railway opened the Gomoh-Barkakana line. It was extended to Daltonganj in 1929. Later it was extended to Sonnagar on Howrah-Delhi Grand Chord line and one more branch was extended to Singrauli from Garwa Road.

At present the district railway network is divided between two zone East Central Railways and South Eastern Railway.

Ramgarh Cantonment, Mael, Barkipona, Gola Road, Harubera, Sondimra and Barlanga Station come under Ranchi Division of SER.

Ranchi Road, Chainpur, Argada, Barkakana Junction, Bhurkunda, Patratu and Tokisud station come Under Dhanbad Division of ECR.

Barkakana is a railway sub-division under Dhanbad division of East Central Railway zone. Doubling of Danea-Ranchi Road line has announced in the Railway Budget 2013–14.

New rail line project 
Ranchi-Koderma-Tilaiya Junction railway station (Bihar) new rail line project of the state passes through the district. The district portion between Sidhwar-Barkakana-Kuju and Mandu is already completed. The distance between Ranchi and Barkakana by train will be reduced by half with the new rail line. Completion of this project will also shorten the distance between Barkakana, Patna and Delhi. The Bakhtiyarpur–Rajgir line was extended to Tilaiya in 2010. After completion of the line, Barkakana will be connected to Bakhtiyarpur. Rajgir, Biharsharif, etc. Tilaiya Junction railway station is situated near Rajoli of Nawada district of Bihar, not to be confused with Tilaiya, Tilaiya Dam, or Jhumri Tilaiya of Jharkhand.

The -long Barkakana-Hazaribagh section of the new Koderma-Ranchi line project was inaugurated on 7 December 2016 by Railway Minister Suresh Prabhu in the presence of Chief Minister Raghubar Das.

Special passenger train service started on 31 March 2017 from Barkakana Junction to Sidhwar station of Barkakana–Ranchi new line section.

A trial run of the passenger train between Tatisilwai and Sanki railway stations (31.4 km) on Ranchi Barkakana's new rail line was conducted on 17 January 2018.

The new railway line between Tatisilwai and Sanki was inaugurated by CM Ragubar Das on 29 August 2019. Two new pairs of passenger trains between Hatia and Sanki stations were implemented on 29 August 2019.

Railway stations and halts 

Barkakana Junction Railway Station :

Barkakana junction is the only junction in the district.

Zone: ECR/East Central Division: Dhanbad

Passenger Train (Ranchi-Barkakana-Hazaribag-Koderma new rail line)

 Barkakana-Koderma

 Koderma-Barkakana

Ramgarh Cantonment Railway Station:

Ramgarh Cantonment railway station is situated at Bijulia near NH33. It is around one kilometer from the city bus stand.

Ranchi Road Railway Station:

Ranchi Road Railway station is situated in the northern side of Ramgarh city. In 1927, the Central India Coalfields Railway opened the Gomoh-Barkakana line. Jharkhand capital Ranchi was once connected only by narrow-gauge line and at that time Ranchi Road Railway station was the nearest broad-gauge station to Ranchi City.

Patratu Railway Station:

Patratu Railway Station has a number of daily, weekly and express services.

Burkunda Railway Station:

Barkakana-Patna, Palamu Express, (daily) b) Patna-Barkakana, Palamu Express, (daily)

Gola Road Railway Station:

Tatanagar-Raulkela-Delhi-Jammutawi Express, (daily) b) Jammutawi-Delhi-Raulkela-Tatanagar Express, (daily)

Roads 

Road are the major means of transportation in the district. Three major expressways (NH-33, NH-23 and SH-2) pass through the district. The State Highways Authority of Jharkhand (SHAJ) is planning to construct a four-lane road between Patratu and Dhanbad via Sayal, Naya Mor, Chas Mor and Raj Ganj.

National highway

The main national highways crossing the district are NH-33 and NH-23.

National Highway 23 connects to NH-33 at Mahatma Gandhi Chowk, Ramgarh Cantonment.

State highways serving the area include State Highway No.2.

Nearest Airport 

Birsa Munda Airport at Ranchi is the nearest airport. Direct links are available to prominent cities such as Delhi, Patna, Mumbai and Kolkata.

Education

Schools 

Central government schools

 Kendriya Vidyalaya : a) Ramgarh Cantonment b) Bhurkunda c) Patratu d) Barkakana
 Kendriya Vidyalaya	Bhurkunda Po Bhurkhunda
 Kendriya Vidyalaya	Patratu Po Diesel Colony Patratu 
 Kendriya Vidyalaya	Barkakana

Private sector schools
 Sarvoday Niketan Kuju
 Apex Public School, NH-23, Gola Road, Marang Marcha
 D A V Public School: a) N T S Barkakana b) Rajrappa Project c) Kedla d) Ara e) Agrasen DAV, Bharech Nagar
 Shri Guru Nanak Senior Secondary School, Ramgarh Cantonment
 J.M. Divine Adarsh Vidiya (p) School, Chhattar Mandu, Ramgarh
 Sidhartha Public School, Ramgarh Cantonment
 Sri Krishna Vidya Mandir, Ramgarh Cantonment
 Siddhartha Public School, Rishipattanam (Near Chutupallu)
 Saraswati Vidya Mandir :a) Rapappa Project, b) Sirka, c) Sarubera
 Radha Gobind Public School, Ramgarh Cantonment
 Holy Cross School, Ghatotand
 St. Ann's School, Kaitha, Ramgarh Cantonment
 Ramprasad Chandra Bhan Public School, Ramgarh Cantonment.
 Nehru Children Convent High School, Rajeev Nagar, Ghato Tand
 D. A. V. Public School, N. T. S. Barkakana
 Agrasen D. A. V. Public School, Bharech Nagar, Ramgarh.
 Shri Guru Nanak Senior Secondary School-on NH-33, near Block Office.
 Army Public School, on Ramgarh-Bhurkunda Road
 Radha Gobind Public School, near Ramgarh College, Jara Tola.
 Goodwill Mission School Rajrappa Road Gola 
 Shri Krishna Vidhya Mandir, Vikas Nagar, near Gaushala, AT & PO - Ramgarh Cantonment
 Sidhartha Public School, Near Ramgarh Block Office.
 St Ann's School, Kaitha, Gola Road.
 Delhi Public School
 K.G.T. School, near Block Office.
 Pradise Public School, Coming Soon
 Islamic Academy, Saudagar Mohalla, Ramgarh Cantonment.
 Madarsa Anjuman Muslemin Khademin, Saudagar Mohalla, Ramgarh Cantonment.
 Maulana Azad Public School (MAPS), Chaingada, Ramgarh
 Darsgaah-e-Islaami, Chitarpur, Ramgarh
 Sainik School, PRC.
 Public High School, Kuju
 Bal Vidya Mandir, Ara Colliery P.O. Sarubera (Kuju) Distt-Ramgarh Jharkhand, 
 D.A.V. Public School, Ara 
 D. A. V. Public School	Tapin North (R R W) P.O. Tapin 
 D. A. V. Public School	Rajrappa Project 
 D. A. V. Public School	Urimari Sayal Po Sayal 
 D. A. V. Public School	Kedla Ccl P O Kedla
 Dav Public School	P.O.-Gidi-A, Ccl, Argada Area., Argada Area 
 Holy Cross School	Ghatotand West Bokaro Jharkhand, Ghatotand 
 O P Jindal School	P O Balkudra, Patratu, 
 Patratu School of Economics	P.O. Patratu Thermal Power Station, P.O. Box No. 13, P.O. Patratu Thermal Power Station 
 Saraswati Shishu Vidya Mandir- P.O. Sarubera 
 Saraswati Vidya Mandir-Rapappa Project Po Rajrappa 
 Saraswati Vidya Mandir-At Sirka G M Office Post Argada
 Ramprasad Chandra Bhan Public School, Bazar Samitee, Ramgarh
 D. A. V. Public School, Topa
Sri Agrasen Senior Secondary School, Patel Nagar, Bhurkunda, Ramgarh

State government schools

 Gandhi Memorial High School, Lohar Tola, near old bus stand, Ramgarh Cantonment
 Kuju High School, Kuju
 S.V.N. High School, Ghatotand
Chitarpur high School, Chitarpur

Other schools

 Army Public School, Ramgarh Cantonment. (Army Welfare Education Society)

Colleges 

Constituent colleges:

 Ramgarh College, Ramgarh.

Non constituent colleges:

 C.N. College, Ramgarh
 J.M. College, Bhurkunda
 Jubilee College, Bhurkunda
 P.T.P.S. College, Patratu.
 Mandu college

Technical Institutes 

Engineering colleges

Ramgarh Engineering College opened in 2013. The government is also planning to open Jharkhand state's first women's engineering college in Ramgarh.

Medical colleges

The government is planning to open a new ESI Medical College in the district.

Management College

Birsa Institute of Technical Education (B.I.T.E. Ramgarh) opened in 2012 in Ramgarh.

Pharmacy College/Institute

Trinity Education: Ranchi Road, Ramgarh Cantonment

Markets and entertainment 

Markets: 
 Main markets are Ramgarh, Patratu, Bhurkunda, Kuju and Gola.

Sports
The Temple of Warriors (Karate Club)

Clubs:
 Rotary Club: near Mahatma Gandhi Chowk, Ramgarh Cantonment. The Rotary Club of Ramgarh held its inaugural meeting on 5 November 1961.
 Lions Club: a) Ramgarh Cantonment b) Bhurkunda.
 Gymkhana Club: Ranchi Road, Ramgarh.

Museum
 Zarina Khatoon Museum Cum Research Centre at Chitarpur.

Culture

Fairs and festivals 

The major and most celebrated fairs and festivals include Diwali, Holi, Durga Puja or Navaratri, Dussehra, Ramanavami, Karam or Karma, Sarhul, Tusu, Eid, Sarsawati puja, Chhath, Makar Sankranti, and Jivitputrika or Jitiya. Due to the presence of industry and mining activities, Vishwakarma Puja is also an important festival. Makar Sankranti fair at Rajrappa Mandir also attracts many people. Fairs are also organized during Jitiya, Karma and other festivals.

Cuisine 

Ramgarh has a variety of foods and cuisines. The most well-known and common cuisine in Ramgarh includes roti (chapati) or phulka, rice or bhat, dal, sabzi or tarkari and achar (South Asian pickles). Dhuska and barra are popular local fast foods. Dhuska is made from rice and urad dal. Barra is also prepared using urad dal. Different types of flowers and leaves are used including bamboo shoots (karil), fried pumpkin flower pakora, khukri and mushroom tarkari. Khoya pedas of Rajrappa mandir is also a famous dry sweet.

Filming locations 
A number of Bollywood movies were shot in the area, including Kaala Patthar, Koyelaanchal, M.S. Dhoni: The Untold Story, Ranchi Diaries and Sholay.

Places of interest

Pilgrimage sites 

The Raghu baba of this temple is from the nearby village Digwar and hence most of the Digwar villagers are connected to this temple. It is very near Ranchi road, just  ahead towards the way of Village Digwar.
 Mayatungri Temple: It is also known as Daughter of the Hills and is  South of Ramgarh in the Chutupalu Valley. Every year the local festival of karma is celebrated here with gaiety and fanfare by the people of the surrounding villages. It is popularly believed that worshipping on the hill brings rain to this area. Nowadays on the occasion of Durgapuja, Nawratra is performed twice a year on this hill.
It has been declared a national monument. The temple was built in 1670. The Shivalinga in the temple is located at a height which is accessible by means of two stairs. At present this temple is in a dilapidated condition.
 Khere Math: Khere Math temple of Gautama Buddha is situated at Matwa-tand village near NH-23 of Gola Block.
 Gurudawara Singh Sabha: This Gurudwara was established and inaugurated by the Sikh community of Ramgarh around 1940 in a small room situated on Shivajee road in Ramgarh. Today a grand structure has taken the form of Gurudwara Sri Guru Singh Sabha in place of that small room. It is the centre of attraction for its great tomb and minarets. The interior decoration of the Darbar hall of Gurudwara Sahib is picture squire.

Rajrappa Mandir 

This temple is noted in the Vedas and Puranas and it has been recognized as an ancient and strong source of Shakti, or divine energy. The Chhinamastika Temple is a place of Hindu pilgrimage. Devotees from all parts of the country visit this holy place throughout the year. The temple is very old and its architectural design is the same as that of other temples of tantrik importance, though its antiquity is yet to be dated. Marriages are also solemnized here on a large scale. The headless statue of the goddess Chhinamastika (छिन्नमस्तिका) stands upon the bodies of Kamdeo and Rati in a lotus bed. A number of other temples have come up around the original temple, particularly, the temples of Mahavidyas (Tara, Shodashi, Bhubneswari, Bhairavi, Bagla, Kamla, Matangi, and Dhumavati) built in a series as well as other temples. These include the Sun God temple, Lord Shiva temple, Hanuman temple, and Ma Kali temple. In Hindu mythology, Damodar is considered an incarnation of the god Shiva and while Bharvi is the goddess Shakti. The confluence of both rivers in Rajrappa is considered a scared union of Damoder (Shiva) and Bharvai (Shakti). The water of the river Bharvi flows down from the top to the river Damoder which flows below, which also shows goddess or devi power. Many take a dip in the river before offering puja. According to the chapter "Ramgarh" from the book East India Gazetteer by Walter Hamilton, published in 1828, as well as Comprehensive History of Bihar by Dr. Bindeshwari Prasad Sinha published in 1974, there is no evidence of pilgrimage places like Rajrappa or existence of the Chhinamastika Temple at Rajrappa in the Ramgarh area of undivided Bihar.

A hundred years ago, the Damodar river was known as Damuda;  means 'sacred' and  means 'water' in the Mundari language.  means 'the burning place of kings' in Mundari;  means 'burn'. According to historian G. S. Sardesai, Rajputs from West India came to Bengal in Peshwa Nana Saheb's train. There was a last clash between Peshwa and Raghuji Bhonshle between present-day Gola and the Chitrapur mountain pass of Ramgarh in 1743. Peshwa's advance troops missed their passage to Ramgarh and turned towards the jungle, reaching an area near the confluence of the Bera river near Damuda. The missing unfortunate general was likely the Prince of Jawa (Mewar) Karam Singh with his troops, and they never joined Peshwa due to the dense forest and unknown mountain pass. Some Rajpoots passed away and were burnt there; later, this wild place was recognised as Rajrappa by Mundari-speaking people. After some years the area became prominent due to the daughter of Karam Raja Tusu. She became a sati by sacrificing her life in the Rajrappa waterfall after one day of Makar to get rid of Mirza Ramjani, brother of the deceased Mogul Nawab Siraj. After that, there was a tradition of immersing Tusu's idol at Rajrappa on the anniversary of her death. Later on, her soul was worshiped by her men and local people at Rajrappa in a small mandir by Sabar priest. Still now the Makar mela (fair) is very famous among the local people, but several years ago Tusu's immersion was declined for many reasons described by the natives. Some Bramhin priests from Medinpur settled near Rajrappa due to the gathering of people and the popularity of the small mandir. Tusu's name was later forgotten and her small mandir was shifted some feet above near the waterfall and converted to Chhinamastika Temple recently.

Rajrappa is not only famous for Shakti Peeth (शक्तिपीठ, shrines) but is also a picnic spot. Food, cooking materials, groceries, milk, fruits and fresh vegetables are also available in the market.
One portion of the sand beach by the river Bharvi is prepared for picnics by madir samiti with the help of a caretaker or agent. They will provide space with Chatai, table, etc. after paying a nominal charge. During the rainy season the paid sand beach is submerged with water.

How to reach

 By air: the nearest airport is Ranchi
 By rail: the nearest railway stations are Ramgarh Cantonment station, Ranchi Road, Barkakana, Ranchi, Koderma.
 By road: Get down at Ramgarh Cantonment and take a trekker or Jeep to reach Rajrappa Mandir. From early morning to evening trekkers or Jeeps are available at the old bus stand.
 Bus service: only one bus service provided by Ramgarh project Cooperative Society runs between Rajrappa mandir and Ranchi (Ratu Road) via Ramgarh Cantonment. Regular bus services are available from the new bus stand Ramgarh Cantonment to all important places in Jharkhand and Bihar.
 Road route: Route for tourists coming from Ranchi, Jamshedpur, and Hazaribag:

Ramgarh Cantonment-Chitarpur (Rajrappa Mor)-Rajrappa Mandir (17+11=)

Route for tourists coming from Dhanbad, Bokaro and Muri:

Gola-Rajrappa Mandir. (Do not go during rainy season)

Gola-Chitarpur (Rajrappa Mor)-Rajrappa Mandir

Accommodations

Low and medium budget hotels are available at Ramgarh Cantonment.

Jharkhand tourism department has constructed a new mega complex in Rajrappa mandir for tourists which consists of:

 Yoga center (manthan)
 Meditation or Dhayan center (moksha)
 Dharamshala (rest house): Alaknanda, Mandakni, Bhagarathi

The dharamshala (rest house) consists of 16 deluxe rooms.
One stage is also constructed for the purpose of marriages and other ceremonies. The complex is ready and will soon be open to the public.

Event

Rajrappa Mohatsav:

The two-day grand Rajrappa Mahatsav is a tourism event organized for the promotion of the historic Rajrappa Temple of Jharkhand. With the joint efforts of Ramgarh District Administration, Central Coalfields Limited (CCL) authorities, CSR of corporate houses and Chinamastika Temple Administration, it was marked as a huge success on the first attempt. Many renowned artists including Abhijit Bhatacharya, Pooja Gaitonde, Chetan Joshi, Padamshree Mukund Nayak, Megha Dalton, and Bharat Sharma performed during the Mohatsav. The event was held for the first time on 25 and 26 February 2017.

Historic monuments 

Mahatama Gandhi Samadhi Sathal:

This sthal popularly known as Gandhi Ghat is situated on the bank of river Damodar in Ramgarh. Mohandas K. Gandhi had visited Ramgarh in 1940 at the time of the Indian National Congress session at Ramgarh. After the assassination of Mahatma Gandhi in 1948, the pitcher containing the remains of the departed were dispatched to different places of the country including Ramgarh. A samadhi of Gandhiji was erected on it. Earlier, a fair used to be organized here on the occasion of the birthday and anniversary of Bapu but now this practice has been abandoned. The samadhi is made of black granite stones.

At the outbreak of World War II, some soldiers who rose up against Mao Zedong, the leader of the Chinese Cultural Revolution and who were also supporters of the friendly states, were captured and imprisoned at Ramgarh. After a few days the soldiers died of hunger and snakebites. A collective burial ground for the soldiers was made; there are a total of 667 graves. In the middle of the graveyard, a pillar in memory of Chiang Kai-shek was erected. There is a Buddhist temple also in its vicinity. Three cantonments have come into existence around the graveyard. Inside the graveyard the pucca roads have been endorsed with rows of flowers. The China Kabristan is a material witness to the annals of the history of Ramgarh.

Megalithic sites of Ramgarh District: Ramgarh district is very rich in ancient and historical sites. Different megalith sites have been identified near Chitarpur, Gola and Kuju.

Nature tourism 
 

Surrounded by hills, forest and rivers, Nalkari dam is used for picnicking and boating. The dam was constructed with the purpose of supplying water to Patratu Thermal Power Station. The total storage capacity of this dam is 81 square miles. Boating began on 14 January 2010 on the dam. Patratu dam is located 28 km from Ramgarh Cantonment and 35 km from Ranchi.

The fall is created on the course of Sherbhuki river. The road only goes up to Sidhwar village, so an approach road should be constructed from Sidhwar village to fall. The water falls from approximately  height.

Am-Jharia Fall: Situated near the border of Halwadi and Sidhwar village.

Dhara Fall: Dhara Fall is situated near Khakara village under Gola Block. The government is planning to construct an approach road from NH-23 (between Gola and Peterwar) to the fall.

It is a hot water spring (pond).

Bankhetta: Situated near Chutupallu. Water falls from a height giving the feeling of rainfall in a cave when someone claps inside.

Liril Fall: Situated between Ramgarh and Chutupallu, it looks like the fall from the old Liril soap advertisement. It is popularly known as Liril Fall.

Water falls from the ceiling, giving the feeling of rainfall in a cave when someone claps.

Hundru Fall: The Hundru Fall located near the Ranchi-Ramgarh district border is created on the course of the Subarnarekha River.

See also 
 Kaitha village
 List of Chief Ministers of Jharkhand
 South Karanpura Coalfield

References

External links

Ashish Kumar Dangi
 Ramgarh district website

 
Districts of Jharkhand
Coal mining districts in India
2007 establishments in Jharkhand